Pyncostola is a genus of moths in the family Gelechiidae.

Species
Pyncostola abnormalis Janse, 1950
Pyncostola actias (Meyrick, 1904)
Pyncostola albicolorella Janse, 1950
Pyncostola alloea Janse, 1960
Pyncostola auturga Meyrick, 1921
Pyncostola bohemiella (Nickerl, 1864)
Pyncostola celeris Meyrick, 1920
Pyncostola crateraula Meyrick, 1918
Pyncostola dicksoni Janse, 1950
Pyncostola flavostriga Janse, 1950
Pyncostola fusca Janse, 1950
Pyncostola fuscofascia Janse, 1950
Pyncostola grandicornuta Bidzilya & Mey, 2011
Pyncostola hiberna (Meyrick, 1912)
Pyncostola illuminata (Meyrick, 1913)
Pyncostola invida (Meyrick, 1911)
Pyncostola iospila (Meyrick, 1909)
Pyncostola lacteata Janse, 1950
Pyncostola magnanima (Meyrick, 1912)
Pyncostola melanatracta (Meyrick, 1910)
Pyncostola merista Meyrick, 1918
Pyncostola monophanes Janse, 1960
Pyncostola nigrinotata Janse, 1950
Pyncostola ochraula Meyrick, 1918
Pyncostola oeconomica Meyrick, 1920
Pyncostola operosa (Meyrick, 1909)
Pyncostola pachyacma Meyrick, 1926
Pyncostola pammacha (Meyrick, 1913)
Pyncostola pentacentra (Meyrick, 1912)
Pyncostola perlustrata Meyrick, 1920
Pyncostola powelli Janse, 1950
Pyncostola sciopola (Meyrick, 1904)
Pyncostola semnochroa (Meyrick, 1913)
Pyncostola stalactis (Meyrick, 1904)
Pyncostola suffusellus (Walsingham, 1891)
Pyncostola tanylopha Janse, 1960
Pyncostola variegata Janse, 1950
Pyncostola veronica Janse, 1950
Pyncostola xanthomacula Janse, 1963

References

 
 
 , 2010: The gelechiid fauna of the southern Ural Mountains, part I: descriptions of seventeen new species (Lepidoptera: Gelechiidae). Zootaxa 2366: 1-34. Abstract: http://www.mapress.com/zootaxa/2010/f/z02366p034f.pdf].
 , 2011: New and little known species of Lepidoptera of southwestern Africa. Esperiana Buchreihe zur Entomologie Memoir 6: 146-261.

 
Isophrictini